Paranapalliya Guruge Anoja Kanthi Siriwardena (Sinhala:අනොජා වීරසිංහ), popularly as Anoja Weerasinghe (born January 21, 1955), is an actress in Sri Lankan cinema, stage drama and television. One of the most respected film actresses in Sinhala cinema, Weerasinghe won the Golden Award at New Delhi Film Festival for her critics acclaimed movie Maldeniye Simion.

Personal life

Born on 21 January 1955 near Badulla, as the seventh of the 12 siblings in the family which includes seven daughters and five sons. Her father was Jeldeen Siriwardena and mother was Wijayasinghe Arachchige Seelavathi. Anoja had older siblings: Shanthi, Sunethra, Asoka, Sunil and Maya Damayanthi. Anura, Shiyan, Lekha, Sandhya, Sudath are younger brothers and sisters.

After few years, the family moved to Monaragala due to many political disputes. Her father was a theatre actor who performed in stage dramas such as Barrister Hamu and Hingana Kolla. Her first marriage was celebrated in 1979 and lasted only for twelve years, where she married again to a plantation owner in 1991.

With the failure of her second marriage, she faced a number of challenges where she went to commit suicide seven times. Once she swallowed a bunch of sleeping pills due to stress and depression.

Career 
Meanwhile, when Anoja was in grade 9, she acted in the play Anduren Eliyata produced by Newton Gunaratne and Yoga Balasuriya of Mahanama College, Moneragala. Weerasinghe first came to the screen with a minor role in Yasapalitha Nanayakkara's film Tak Tik Tuk. His first main role came through role Surangi of Yasapalitha's film Monarathenna. She appeared in the Australian film Island in 1989.

In the film Maldeniye Simieon, she played dual roles, which became her turning point. For the roles, she won the Best Supporting Actress at the 11th New Delhi International Film Festival. Then she established herself in the 1980s in Sinhala cinema, made his mark in popular cinema with the film Obata Diwura Kiyannam. Her popular role in 1980s came through Araliya Mal, Channayi Kello Dennayi, Peraḷikārayō, Mamayi Rajā, Sināsenna Raththaran and Yukthiyaṭa Væḍa. She later won Best Actress award at Sarasaviya, Presidential, OCIC and Swarnasanka awards for her performances in artistic films such as Kelimadala, Gurugedara, Surabidena, Julietge Bhumikawa, Muhudu Lihini, Seilama, Siri Medura and Janelaya.

Weerasinghe rose to popularity in cinema  and acclaim after winning the Silver Peacock Award for the Best Actress at the New Delhi International Film Festival in 1987 for the film Maldeniye Simion, directed by Dr. D. B. Nihalsinghe and produced by Vijaya Ramanayake for Tharanga Films. This was the first time a Sri Lankan actress won a best actress award at an international film festival. Thereafter she went on to LAMDA in London to further hone her skills and won further accolades, nationally and internationally. She has been honored with the Kohinoor Award by the Governor of Tamil Nadu, Government of Sri Lanka's Kala Suri national award, the Asian Film Center tribute to her in 1994, Munich International Film Festival retrospective of her films, and the state governments of Kerala and West Bengal retrospectives of her films are  among the many accolades she has received.

Apart from Sinhala films, Anoja played a leading role in the Australian film Island directed by Paul Cox. She has also acted in Pakistani Urdu films like Raththathin Rath Thame, India-Sri Lanka co-production film Hum Se Na Takrana, Agar Tum Na Hote, Suraj Bhi Tamasha, Miss Lanka, Naadani, and Do Haath. After that, she studied music, acting and voice acting at the London Academy of Music and Dramatic Art (Lamda) in London. After return to Sri Lanka, she started the 'Advanced Performing Arts Institute' on the land belonging to the Bellanwila Rajamaha Vihara adjoining temple.

Stage dramas
 Satana
 Prashnaya
 Age Nama Rathi
 Manaskola
 Trojan Kanthawo'''
 Diriya Mawa Saha Age Daruwo Ran Salakuna  Memories of Monkey boyAwards
She is a recipient of many local, regional and international awards.

 Presidential Special Award 1984 - Muhudu Lihini 
 Sarasaviya Awards 1985 - Hithwathiya 
 Presidential Award 1985 Merit Award - Hithawathiya 
 Sarasawiya Award 1986 Merit Award - Mihidum Salu 
 Best Actress in 1986 State Awards 
 Best Costume Design in 1986 State Awards 
 Sarasaviya Awards 1986 Best Film - Obata Diwura Kiyannam Best Actress in 1987 Sarasaviya Awards - Maldeniye Simion 
 Best Actress in 1987 OCIC Awards - Maldeniye Simion 
 Best Actress in 1987 Presidential Awards - Maldeniye Simion 
 Rajatha Mayura Award for Best Actress in 1987  
 Best Actress in 11th Indian International Film Festival - Maldeniye Simion 
 Best Television Actress in 1987 - Thaara Devi 
 Rana Thisara Award in 1987 
 Kalsuri Award in 1987 
 Honor Award in 1987 
 Woman of the Year 1987 -  Vanitha Award at Rotary International Club 
 Best Actress in 1990 Sarasaviya Awards - Sirimedura 
 Best Actress in 1987 OCIC Awards - Sirimedura 
 Koinor Rathna Award 1990 
 Most Popular Actress in 1991 Vanitha Award 
 Best Actress in 1992 Sarasaviya Awards - Kelimadala 
 Best Actress in 1992 OCIC Awards - Kelimadala 
 Best Producer in 1992 Sarasaviya Awards - Kelimadala 
 Best Actress in 1994 Sarasaviya Awards - Surabidena 
 Best Actress in 1994 Presidential Awards - Gurugedara 
 Best Actress in 1994 Swarna Sankha Award - Surabidena 
 Fringee First Award at Edinburg Drama Festival 2005 - Children of the Sea producer 
 Tap Water Award at Edinburg Drama Festival 2005 - Children of the Sea producer
 Best Actress in 2006 State Awards - Diriya Mawa Saha Age Daruwa''

Filmography
 No. denotes the Number of Sri Lankan film in the Sri Lankan cinema.

References

External links 
Anoja Weerasinghe's Biography in Sinhala Cinema Database

Anoja's page-(hollywood.com)
Official Website - National Film Corporation of Sri Lanka
අනෝජා වීරසිංහ මවගේ මතකය සිහිපත් කරයි
අනෝජා වීරසිංහ යළිත් වේදිකාවට
රජත මයුරිය අනෝජා වීරසිංහ ජීවිතය දිනන හැටි කියා දෙන්නීය
ඇත්තටම දැන් තමයි ජීවත් වෙන්නේ
2020 ට අලුත් අනෝජා කෙනෙක්

Living people
Sri Lankan film actresses
20th-century Sri Lankan actresses
1955 births